Mindarinae is a small subfamily of the family Aphididae.

References

 
Hemiptera subfamilies